The 1999 NCAA Division I women's volleyball tournament began on December 2, 1999, with 64 teams and ended December 18 when Penn State defeated Stanford in Honolulu, Hawaii, for the program's first NCAA title.

Penn State, appearing in their third straight title match, crushed Stanford in three games to claim the school's first ever national championship. The Lions had fallen short in five games the previous two years, falling to Stanford in 1997 and Long Beach State in 1998.

Records

The tournament field remained steady at 64 teams for a second straight year. The Big Ten led the way with eight bids in the 1999 NCAA Tournament, followed by the Big 12 with six bids and the Pac-10 with five bids. This was the last year to feature teams regionally seeded from 1-4. Bracket-wide seeding from 1-16 would begin in 2000. The Final Four was held in Hawaii for the first time since 1989, and has not been held outside the 48 contiguous states since.

Central Regional (University Park)

East Regional (Stockton)

Pacific Regional (Stanford)

Mountain Regional (Honolulu)

Final Four – Stan Sheriff Center, Honolulu, HI

National Semifinals

Penn State vs. Pacific

Penn State reached their third consecutive final after outlasting Pacific in five games. The Nittany Lions were paced by senior All-American Lauren Cacciamani with 26 kills, six blocks and a .304 attack percentage. Pacific was led by Elsa Stegemann who had a match high 31 kills. Pacific ended their season 32-3.

Stanford vs. Long Beach State

Behind freshman Logan Tom's 27 kills, Stanford downed defending national champion Long Beach State in three games.

Long Beach State opened the match scoring the first two points of game 1, but Stanford would control it from there, scoring eight straight points. In game 2, Stanford trailed 6-3 but took six of the next seven points to take the 9-7 lead. A service ace would seal game two for the Cardinal. Stanford dominated game 3, scoring the first 13 points before taking it 15-3.

National Championship: Penn State vs. Stanford 

Appearing in the program's third straight title match, the top ranked Penn State Nittany Lions crushed second ranked Stanford in three sets to claim the school's first national title.

In game 1, Penn State jumped out to the 8-0 lead, before taking the first game 15-2. The Lions had 10 team blocks in game 1 alone, and hit .258 in game 1. Stanford had 19 hitting errors in the opening game.

Stanford jumped out to the 3-1 lead in game 2, but Penn State tied the game up at 6. After that, Penn State scored six straight points to take the 12-6 lead. Stanford would get no closer than three points, as Penn State took game 2 15-10.

Penn State lead 7-6 in game 3, and eventually stretched the lead to 11-6. Stanford scored their last point on a Lion hitting error, as Penn State scored the final four points. A Stanford hitting error that sailed wide sealed the national championship for Penn State, 15-7.

Penn State's Lauren Cacciamani, the co-AVCA National Player of the Year with Kerri Walsh, had 20 kills and hit .344, while Walsh hit .000 with 11 kills and 11 errors. As a team, Stanford hit negative .008 (39 kills, 40 errors) while Penn State hit .240 (48 kills, 19 errors).

After losing their first match of the season, the Nittany Lions reeled off 36 consecutive wins. The win gave Russ Rose his first NCAA title as the Penn State head coach after three previous runner-up finishes, while Stanford finished as NCAA runners-up for the fourth time in school history.

NCAA Tournament records

There is one NCAA tournament record that was set in the 1999 tournament that still stands.

Kills in a match (individual record) - Elsa Stegemann, University of the Pacific - 46 kills vs. Michigan (2nd round)

References

NCAA Women's Volleyball Championship
NCAA
Sports in Honolulu
NCAA Division I women's volleyball tournament
Volleyball in Hawaii
December 1999 sports events in the United States
Sports competitions in Honolulu